The 1922 Kentucky Derby was the 48th running of the Kentucky Derby. The race took place on May 13, 1922.

Full results

Winning Breeder: Adolph B. Spreckels; (CA)
Horse Banker Brown scratched before the race.

Payout

 The winner received a purse of $53,775.
 Second place received $6,000.
 Third place received $3,000.
 Fourth place received $1,000.

References

1922
Kentucky Derby
Derby
Kentucky Derby
Kentucky Derby